Herman Hilton (first ¼ 1894 – first ¼ 1947) was an English professional rugby league footballer who played in the 1910s and 1920s. Hilton is an Oldham Hall Of Fame Inductee.

Hilton was selected to go on the 1920 Great Britain Lions tour of Australasia. He won caps for Great Britain while at Oldham in 1920 against Australia (3 matches), and New Zealand (3 matches), and in 1922 against Australia. Hilton also won caps for England while at Oldham in 1921 against Wales, Other Nationalities, and Australia,

Background
Herman Hilton's birth was registered in Springhead, near Oldham and his death aged 52–53 was registered in Blackpool, Lancashire,

Playing career

Championship final appearances
Hilton played right-, i.e. number 10, in Oldham's 2-13 defeat by Wigan in the Championship Final during the 1921–22 season at The Cliff, Broughton on Saturday 6 May 1922.

Challenge Cup Final appearances
Herman Hilton played  in Oldham's 4-21 defeat by Wigan in the 1924 Challenge Cup Final during the 1923–24 season at Athletic Grounds, Rochdale on Saturday 12 April 1924, and played , and was captain in the 16-3 victory over Hull Kingston Rovers in the 1925 Challenge Cup Final during the 1924–25 season at Headingley Rugby Stadium.

County Cup Final appearances
About Herman Hilton's time, there was Oldham's 5-7 defeat by Warrington in the 1921 Lancashire County Cup Final during the 1921–22 season at The Cliff, Broughton, Salford on Saturday 3 December 1921, he played in Oldham's 7-0 victory over Rochdale Hornets in the 1919–20 Lancashire County Cup Final during the 1919–20 season at The Willows, Salford on Saturday 6 December 1919, and played left-, i.e. number 8, in the 10-0 victory over St Helens Recs in the 1924 Lancashire County Cup Final during the 1924–25 season at The Willows, Salford on Saturday 22 November 1924.

Club career
Herman Hilton transferred from Healey Street ARLFC to Oldham in November 1913, he made his début for Oldham against Leeds at the Watersheddings, Oldham on Monday 15 December 1913, he suffered a serious illness following the end of the 1924–25 season, he attempted a comeback, and he played his last match for Oldham against Wigan in November 1925, after which he retired from playing.

References

External links
(archived by web.archive.org) Roughyeds sign a legend
Statistics at orl-heritagetrust.org.uk
Search for "Herman Hilton" at britishnewspaperarchive.co.uk

1894 births
1947 deaths
England national rugby league team players
English rugby league players
Great Britain national rugby league team players
Lancashire rugby league team players
Oldham R.L.F.C. captains
Oldham R.L.F.C. players
Rugby league locks
Rugby league players from Oldham
Rugby league props
Rugby league second-rows